The British Aerospace Jetstream is a small twin-turboprop airliner, with a pressurised fuselage, developed as the Jetstream 31 from the earlier Handley Page Jetstream.  A larger version of the Jetstream was also manufactured, the British Aerospace Jetstream 41.

Development
Scottish Aviation had taken over production of the original Jetstream design from Handley Page, and when it was nationalised along with other British companies into British Aerospace (later BAE Systems) in 1978, British Aerospace decided the design was worth further development, and started work on a "Mark 3" Jetstream. As with the earlier 3M version for the USAF, the new version was re-engined with newer Garrett turboprops (now Honeywell TPE331) which offered more power (flat rated to 1,020 shp/760 kW with a thermodynamic limit of 1,100 shp/820 kW) and longer overhaul intervals over the original Turbomeca Astazou engines. This allowed the aircraft to be offered in an 18-seat option (six rows, 2+1), with an offset aisle, and with a water methanol option for the engine to allow the ability to operate at maximum load from a greater range of airfields, particularly in the continental United States and Australia.

The result was the Jetstream 31, which first flew on 28 March 1980, being certificated in the UK on 29 June 1982. The new version proved to be as popular as Handley Page hoped the original model would be, and several hundred 31s were built during the 1980s. In 1985, a further engine upgrade was planned, which flew in 1988 as the Jetstream Super 31, also known as the Jetstream 32. Production continued until 1993, by which time 386 31/32s had been produced. Four Jetstream 31s were ordered for the Royal Navy in 1985 as radar observer trainers, the Jetstream T.3, but were later used for VIP transport.

In 1993, British Aerospace adopted the Jetstream name as its brand name for all twin turboprop aircraft. As well as the Jetstream 31 and Jetstream 32, it also built the related Jetstream 41 and the unrelated, but co-branded BAe ATP/Jetstream 61. The Jetstream 61 name was never used in service, and retained its "ATP" marketing name. The company also proposed but never built the Jetstream 51 and Jetstream 71.

Variants

 Jetstream 31 Airliner: 18/19 passenger commuter airliner.
 Jetstream 31 Corporate: 12-passenger executive transport aircraft.
 Jetstream 31EP: Enhanced performance.
 Jetstream 31EZ: EEZ or maritime patrol version.
 Jetstream Executive Shuttle: 12-seat executive transport aircraft.
 Jetstream 31 Special: Utility transport aircraft.
 Jetstream 32EP: Enhanced performance, 19-passenger.
 Jetstream QC (Quick Change)

Operators

In July 2019, 70 Jetstream 31s were in airline service : 49 in Americas, 15 in Europe, 5 in Asia Pacific and 1 in Africa. Airline operators with five or more aircraft were:

 Northwestern Air
 Pascan Aviation
 SARPA
 AIS Airlines
 Transmandu
 FlyPelican

Accidents and incidents
 On May 26, 1987, a Continental Express flight, operated by Air New Orleans as flight 2962 (registration N331CY), crash landed just after takeoff from New Orleans International Airport. The plane crashed into eight lanes of traffic and subsequently injured two persons on the ground. Of the 11 occupants on board, there were zero fatalities. The cause of the crash was attributed to pilot error, including failing to follow checklists.
 On 26 December 1989, United Express Flight 2415 operated by N410UE of North Pacific Airlines crashed short of the runway at Tri-Cities Airport, Washington, USA. The crew executed an excessively steep and unstabilized ILS approach. That approach, along with improper air traffic control commands and aircraft icing, caused the aircraft to stall. Both crew members and all four passengers were killed.
 On 12 March 1992, a deadheading USAir Express Jetstream 31 crashed on landing at McGhee Tyson Airport near Knoxville, Tennessee after the pilot failed to lower the landing gear. There were no passengers aboard, but the two crew members were killed.
 On 1 December 1993, Northwest Airlink Flight 5719 had a controlled flight into terrain killing all crew and passengers.
 On 13 December 1994, Flagship Airlines Flight 3379 stalled and crashed while on approach to Raleigh-Durham International Airport in the United States, killing 13 of the 18 passengers and both crewmembers. The captain mistakenly thought that an engine had failed and decided to abandon the landing approach, then lost control of the aircraft.
 On 21 May 2000, an East Coast Aviation Services Jetstream (N16EJ) crashed into terrain after running out of fuel on the flight's second approach into Wilkes-Barre/Scranton International Airport, killing all 19 occupants.
 On 8 July 2000, Aerocaribe Flight 7831 crashed into a mountainous area as the aircraft was on approach into Carlos Rovirosa Pérez International Airport and killed all 19 passengers and crew.
 On 19 October 2004, Corporate Airlines Flight 5966 crashed on approach to Kirksville Regional Airport killing 13 out of 15 passengers and crew. The NTSB deduced pilot error.
 On 18 November 2004, Venezolana Flight 213 crashed into a fire station on landing at Simón Bolívar International Airport (Venezuela) after a flight from Juan Pablo Perez Alfonso Airport. Four passengers were killed out of 21 passengers and crew.
 On 8 February 2008, Eagle Airways Flight 2279 was hijacked by a passenger over New Zealand just after taking off from Woodbourne Airport. The pilot managed to restrain the hijacker eventually and the aircraft landed safely at Christchurch International Airport. The two pilots and one passenger were injured in the hijacking.
 On 8 March 2012, BAe Jetstream 3102 G-CCPW of Links Air, operating Manx2 Flight 302 from Leeds-Bradford Airport, United Kingdom to Ronaldsway Airport, Isle of Man, departed the runway on landing at Ronaldsway. The aircraft was substantially damaged when the starboard undercarriage collapsed. There were no injuries amongst the twelve passengers and two crew.
 Following the 8 March 2012 crash, the same BAe Jetstream 3102 suffered a similar incident, again operated by Links Air under a new registration, when it crashed at Doncaster's Robin Hood Airport on a flight from Belfast on 15 August 2014. This further incident came after reported problems with its undercarriage while landing. The single passenger was taken to hospital for reported minor injuries.
 On 12 October 2014, an engine of a Jetstream 32 aircraft belonging to Air Century Airlines caught fire while landing after a charter flight from Luis Munoz Marin International Airport in Puerto Rico to Puntacana international airport in the Dominican Republic. The aircraft was destroyed in the subsequent fire. There were no injuries among the 13 passengers and two crew members on the flight, the crew handled the situation in a timely and professional manner, avoiding any casualties.

Specifications (Jetstream 31)

See also

References
Notes

1980s British airliners
Jetstream
Twin-turboprop tractor aircraft
Cruciform tail aircraft
Aircraft first flown in 1980
Low-wing aircraft